Eva Gunilla Johansson Rydberg (born 20 June 1943) is a Swedish singer, actress, comedian, revue-artist and dancer.

Biography

Early life
Eva Rydberg was born in Malmö. She started ballet school at a young age and acted at a children's theater at Malmö Folkets Park. In her teens, she danced ballet at Malmö Stadsteater. When she learnt that Povel Ramel was searching for dancers for the Knäppupp-Revue at the Ideontheater in Stockholm, she sent in a photo and got the job. During the summer of 1960, she toured Sweden with Knäppupp during the Karl Gerhards Jubelsommar tour. She then went to the Cirkus Schumann in Copenhagen and then toured with Cirkus Bennewis. At the end of the 1970s, she started working for Francois Bronett at Cirkus Scott and she has also performed at the Paris Olympia.

Theater and Geigert
Rydberg worked with Stora Teatern in Gothenburg and then Odense Theater in Denmark in 1965. There she played the part of the tomboy Anybody in the musical West Side Story. She got a three-year contract with Sandrews and did the same role at Oscarsteatern in Stockholm. In 1966, Rydberg appeared in her first television performance with the comedy segment during the Kvitt eller dubbelt show.

Owe Thörnqvist liked Rydberg's comedic skills and asked her to work with the Hamburger Börs bar shows in 1966. That was the start of a new era in her career. Lars Kühler was Rydberg's stage partner during several bar and television shows. She has also worked over the years with Björn Skifs, Siw Malmkvist, Tommy Körberg, Sten Ardenstam, Mikael Neumann and Ewa Roos.

Film, television, Theater
Rydberg has played in a few films, her first role on screen being at age of 12 with the cult film Drra på, en kul grej på väg till Götet. She also had a part in the comedy film Sound of Näverlur in 1971. She has played parts in four of SVT's Julkalendern shows over the years: Teskedsgumman, Långtradarchaufförens berättelser, Trolltider and Superhjältejul.

She took part in Melodifestivalen 1977 with the entry "Charlie Chaplin" composed by Tomas Ledin, and placed seventh.

She starred in the musical Sweet Charity at Östgötateatern in Norrköping in 1989.

She participated in Melodifestivalen 2021 along with Ewa Roos with their song 'Rena Rama Ding Dong'. The song qualified for the Andra Chansen round, however lost to Clara Klingenström's song and was thus eliminated.

Personal life
Rydberg is married to musician Tony Johansson with whom she has a daughter, singer Birgitta Rydberg. She also has a son Kalle Rydberg with Mats Hellqvist.

Productions

Filmography (selection)
 1955 – Blue Sky
 1967 – Drra på – kul grej på väg till Götet
 1968 – Mysinge motell (TV)
 1968 – Korridoren
 1970 – Vicken vecka (TV)
 1971 – Sound of Näverlur
 1971 – Fixarverkstan (TV)
 1975 – Långtradarchaufförens berättelser (TV)
 1977 – Olle Blom – reporter (TV)
 1978 – Det låter som en saga (TV-film)
 1979 – Makten och hederligheten (TV)
 1979 – Trolltider (TV)
 1989 – The Journey to Melonia
 2005 – Om Sara
 2009 – Superhjältejul (TV)

Discography (selection)
 1973 – Eva med E
 1975 – Hallå där
 1976 – Eva Rydberg
 1978 – Sång à la Rydberg
 1984 – Cirkuslivet

Theater work (Fredriksdalsteatern)
 1993 – Bröderna Östermans huskors (with Nils Poppe)
 1994 – Den tappre soldaten Bom
 1995 – Husan också
 1996 – Upp till camping
 1998 – Sicken ärta
 1999 – Fars lilla tös
 2000 – Arnbergs korsettfabrik
 2001 – Kärlek och lavemang
 2002 – Hon jazzade en sommar
 2003 – Kaos i folkparken
 2004 – Mölle by the Sea
 2005 – Hemvärnets glada dagar
 2006 – Herrskap och tjänstehjon
 2007 – Den stora premiären
 2008 – Rabalder i Ramlösa
 2009 – Lorden från gränden
 2010 – Gröna hissen
 2011 – Viva la Greta
 2012 – Arsenik och gamla spetsar
 2013 – 'Allå, 'allå, 'emliga armén|'Allo 'allo! emliga armén
 2014 – Pang i bygget

Other theater work
 1965 – West side story (Oscarsteatern)
 1966 – Hello Dolly (Oscarsteatern)
 1970 – Hagges revy – Oss jämlikar emellan (Lisebergsteatern)
 1971 – Hagges revy – Hjärtat i Götet (Lisebergsteatern)
 1972 – Hagges revy – Gatans barn (Lisebergsteatern)
 1984 – Parneviks Revyparty (Chinateatern)
 1989 – Sweet Charity (Östgötateatern)
 1991 – Omaka par (Helsingborgs Stadsteater)
 1993 – Pippi Långstrump (Nöjesteatern, Malmö)
 1994 – Omaka par (Lisebergsteatern)
 1995 – Husan också! (Lisebergsteatern)
 1995 – Annie (Köpehamn)
 1996 – Gröna Hissen (Palladium, Malmö)
 1996 – Lilla Fransyskan (Palladium, Malmö)
 1997 – Prosit! Kommissarien (Palladium, Malmö)
 2000 – Kärlek till tusen (Turné med Riksteatern)
 2001 – En midsommarnattsdröm (Hipp, Malmö)
 2001 – Pippi Långstrump (Nöjesteatern Malmö)
 2002 – Arnbergs korsettfabrik (Intiman Stockholm)
 2003 – Änglar med glorian på sne (Nöjesteatern Malmö + turné)
 2004 – Schlageryra i Folkparken (Intiman Stockholm)
 2005 – Annie (Nöjesteatern Malmö)
 2007 – Den stora premiären (Intiman Stockholm)
 2009 – Boeing Boeing (Nöjesteatern Malmö)
 2011 – Obesvarad Kärlek – En sann Broadwaykomedi (Slagthuset, Malmö)

Singles

References

External links

 
 
 

Living people
1943 births
Swedish actresses
20th-century Swedish women singers
Singers from Malmö
21st-century Swedish women singers
Melodifestivalen contestants of 2023
Melodifestivalen contestants of 2021